The Eyalet of Ankara or Angora, also known as the Eyalet of Bosok or Bozok was an eyalet of the Ottoman Empire.

Administrative divisions
Sanjaks of the Eyalet in the mid-19th century:
 Sanjak of Kaisarieh (Cesarea)
 Sanjak of Bozok (Yozgat)
 Sanjak of Angora (Ankara)
 Sanjak of Kiangri (Cangara)

References

Eyalets of the Ottoman Empire in Anatolia
History of Ankara Province
History of Çorum Province
History of Kayseri Province
History of Kırıkkale Province
History of Kırşehir Province
History of Yozgat Province
1827 establishments in the Ottoman Empire
1864 disestablishments in the Ottoman Empire